The Strepsiptera are an order of insects with eleven extant families that include about 600 described species. They are endoparasites in other insects, such as bees, wasps, leafhoppers, silverfish, and cockroaches. Females of most species never emerge from the host after entering its body, finally dying inside it. The early-stage larvae do emerge because they must find an unoccupied living host, and the short-lived males must emerge to seek a receptive female in her host. They are believed to be most closely related to beetles, from which they diverged 300–350 million years ago, but do not appear in the fossil record until the mid-Cretaceous around 100 million years ago.

The order is not well known to non-specialists, and the nearest they have to a common name is stylops. The name of the order translates to "twisted wing"', giving rise to other common names used for the order, twisted-wing insects and twisted-winged parasites.

Adult males are rarely observed, although specimens may be lured using cages containing virgin females. Nocturnal specimens can also be collected at light traps.

Biology

Appearance and structure

Males 
Males of the Strepsiptera have wings, legs, eyes, and antennae, though their mouthparts cannot be used for feeding. Many have mouthparts modified into sensory structures. To the uninitiated the males superficially look like flies. The forewings are modified into small club-shaped structures called halteres, which sense gyroscopic information. A similar organ exists in flies, though in that group the hindwings are modified instead, and the two groups are thought to have independently evolved the structures. The hindwings are generally fan-shaped, and have strongly reduced venation. The antennae are flabellate, and are covered in specialised chemoreceptors, likely to detect females over long distances.

Adult male Strepsiptera have eyes unlike those of any other insect, resembling the schizochroal eyes found in the trilobite group known as the Phacopina. Instead of a compound eye consisting of hundreds to thousands of ommatidia, that each produce a pixel of the entire image - the strepsipteran eyes consist of only a few dozen "eyelets"  that each produce a complete image. These eyelets are separated by cuticle and/or setae, giving the cluster eye as a whole a blackberry-like appearance.

Females 
The females of Stylopidia, which includes all 97% of all described strepsipteran species and all modern strepsipteran families except Mengenillidae and Bahiaxenidae, are not known to leave their hosts and are neotenic in form, lacking wings, legs, and eyes, but have a well sclerotised cephalothorax (fused head and thorax). Adult female mengenillids are wingless but are free living and somewhat mobile with legs and small eyes, this is probably also true for the bahiaxenids, though this has not been observed.

Larvae 
Newly hatched primary (first instar) larvae are on average  in length, smaller than many single-celled organisms. They are highly mobile with well developed stemmata eyes, which are able to distinguish color. The underside of the body is covered in minute hair-like structures (microtrichia), which allow the larvae to stick to wet surfaces via capillary action. At the back of the body are well developed large bristle-like cerci, which are attached to muscles, which allow the larvae to jump. The tarsal segment of their legs have structures which allow them to cling to their hosts. Later larval instars which develop inside the host are completely immobile.

Life cycle 
Virgin females release a pheromone which the males use to locate them. Mating at least in some species is polyandrous, where the female mates with more than one male.

In the Stylopidia, the female's anterior region protrudes out between the segments of the hosts abdomen. In all strepsipterans the male mates by rupturing the female's cuticle (in the case of Stylopida, this is in a deep narrow fissure of the cephalothorax near the birth canal). Sperm passes through the opening directly into the body in a process called traumatic insemination, which has independently evolved in some other insects like bed bugs.

Strepsiptera eggs hatch inside the female, and the planidium larvae can move around freely within the female's haemocoel; this behavior is unique to these insects. The offspring consume their mother from the inside in a process known as hemocelous viviparity. Each female produces many thousands of planidium larvae. The larvae emerge from the brood opening/canal on the female's head, which protrudes outside the host body.

Larvae have legs and actively seek out new hosts. Their legs are partly vestigial in that they lack a trochanter, the leg segment that forms the articulation between the basal coxa and the femur. The larvae are very active as they only have a limited amount of time to find a host before they exhaust their energy reserves. These first-instar larvae have stemmata (simple, single-lens eyes). When the larvae latch onto a host, they enter it by secreting enzymes that soften the cuticle, usually in the abdominal region of the host. Some species have been reported to enter the eggs of hosts. Larvae of Stichotrema dallatorreanurn Hofeneder from Papua New Guinea were found to enter their orthopteran host's tarsus (foot).

Once inside the host, they undergo hypermetamorphosis and transform into a less-mobile, legless larval form. They induce the host to produce a bag-like structure inside which they feed and grow. This structure, made from host tissue, protects them from the immune defences of the host. Larvae go through four more instars, and in each moult the older cuticle separates but is not discarded ("apolysis without ecdysis"), so multiple layers form around the larvae. Male larvae pupate after the last moult, but females directly become neotenous adults. The colour and shape of the host's abdomen may be changed and the host usually becomes sterile. The parasites then undergo pupation to become adults. Adult males emerge from the host bodies, while females stay inside. Females may occupy up to 90% of the abdominal volume of their hosts. Adult males are very short-lived, usually surviving less than five hours, and do not feed.

Parasitism 
Strepsiptera of various species have been documented to attack hosts in many orders, including members of the orders Zygentoma (silverfish and allies), Orthoptera (grasshoppers, crickets) Blattodea (cockroaches), Mantodea (praying mantis), Heteroptera (bugs), Hymenoptera (wasps, ants and bees), and Diptera (flies). In the strepsipteran family Myrmecolacidae, the males parasitize ants, while the females parasitize Orthoptera. Members of Mengenillidae target Zygentoma exclusively, while Stylopidia targets only winged insects, with a large number of stylopidians targeting wasps and bees, while the largest family of strepsipterans, the Stylopidae, with over 27% of all described strepsipterans, targets bees exclusively.

Very rarely, multiple females may live within a single stylopized host; multiple males within a single host are somewhat more common.

Strepsiptera of the family Myrmecolacidae can influence their host's behaviour, causing their ant hosts to linger on the tips of grass leaves, increasing the chance of being found by the parasite's males (in case of females) and putting them in a good position for male emergence (in case of males).

Taxonomy

The fore wings are reduced to halteres.

Strepsiptera were once believed to be the sister group to the beetle families Meloidae and Ripiphoridae, which have similar parasitic development and forewing reduction. Early molecular research suggested their inclusion as a sister group to the flies, in a clade called Halteria, which have one pair of the wings modified into halteres, and failed to support their relationship to the beetles. Further molecular studies, however, suggested they are outside the clade Mecopterida (containing the Diptera and Lepidoptera), but found no strong evidence for affinity with any other extant group. Study of their evolutionary position has been problematic due to difficulties in phylogenetic analysis arising from long branch attraction. Most modern molecular studies find strepsipterans as the sister group of beetles (Coleoptera), with both groups together forming the clade Coleopterida. The most basal strepsipteran is the fossil Protoxenos janzeni discovered in Eocene aged Baltic amber, while the most basal living strepsipteran is Bahiaxenos relictus, the sole member of the family Bahiaxenidae. The earliest known strepsipteran fossils are those of Cretostylops engeli (Cretostylopdiae) and Kinzelbachilla ellenbergeri, Phthanoxenos nervosus and Heterobathmilla kakopoios (Phthanoxenidae), discovered in middle Cretaceous Burmese amber from Myanmar, around 99 million years old, which all lie outside the crown group, but are all more closely related to modern strepsiperans than Protoxenos is. The finding of a parasitic first instar in the same deposit indicates that the parasitic lifestyle of the group has likely existed nearly unchanged for 100 million years, though their evolutionary history prior to this remains a mystery. The idea that mengellinids targeting of zygentomans represents the ancestral ecology of the group as a whole has been considered questionable.

Families

The vast majority of living strepispterans are placed within the grouping Stylopidia, which includes the families Corioxenidae, Halictophagidae, Callipharixenidae, Bohartillidae, Elenchidae, Myrmecolacidae, Stylopidae, Protelencholacidae (extinct) and Xenidae. All Stylopidia have endoparasitic females having multiple genital openings. Two living families Mengenillidae and Bahiaxenidae, are placed outside of this group, along with several extinct families.

The Stylopidae have four-segmented tarsi and four- to six-segmented antennae, with the third segment having a lateral process. The family Stylopidae may be paraphyletic. The Elenchidae have two-segmented tarsi and four-segmented antennae, with the third segment having a lateral process. The Halictophagidae have three-segmented tarsi and seven-segmented antennae, with lateral processes from the third and fourth segments.
The Stylopidae mostly parasitize wasps and bees, the Elenchidae are known to parasitize Fulgoroidea, while the Halictophagidae are found on leafhoppers, treehoppers, and mole cricket hosts.

Strepsipteran insects in the genus Xenos parasitize Polistes carnifex, a species of social wasps. These obligate parasites infect the developing wasp larvae in the nest and are present within the abdomens of female wasps when they hatch out. Here they remain until they thrust through the cuticle and pupate (males) or release infective first-instar larvae onto flowers (females). These larvae are transported back to their nests by foraging wasps.

Cladogram 
After:

Relationship with humans
Some insects which have been considered pests may have strepsipteran endoparasites. Inoculation of a pest population with the corresponding parasitoid may sometimes aid in reducing the impact of such pests, although no strepsipterans have ever been tested for use in this capacity, let alone being available for such purposes, either commercially or experimentally.

See also
 Entomophagous parasite

References

Further reading

External links

 Strepsiptera in Baltic amber (www.amber-inclusions.dk) - Strepsiptera, Mengeidae, Mengea tertiaria
 http://tolweb.org/tree?group=Strepsiptera
 Survey of Modern Counterparts of Schizochroal Trilobite Eyes: Structural and Functional Similarities and Differences 
 Family outline: Strepsiptera
 The Peculiar Strepsiptera Life Cycle
 Strepsiptera discussed in RNZ Critter of the Week, 30 August 2022

 
Insect orders
Insects used as insect pest control agents
Extant Early Cretaceous first appearances
Taxa named by William Kirby (entomologist)
Endoparasites